Américo Ferreira (born 27 January 1934) is a Brazilian weightlifter. He competed in the men's lightweight event at the 1956 Summer Olympics.

References

1934 births
Living people
Brazilian male weightlifters
Olympic weightlifters of Brazil
Weightlifters at the 1956 Summer Olympics
Place of birth missing (living people)